Cyclic Delay Diversity (CDD) is a diversity scheme used in OFDM-based telecommunication systems, transforming spatial diversity into frequency diversity and thus avoiding intersymbol interference.

CDD was introduced in 2001 and can gain frequency diversity at the receiver without changing the SISO receiver structure.

The idea of CDD for OFDM had previously also been submitted as a patent application in September 2000.

References
 Louay M.A. Jalloul and Sam. P. Alex, "Evaluation Methodology and Performance of an IEEE 802.16e System", Presented to the IEEE Communications and Signal Processing Society, Orange County Joint Chapter (ComSig), December 7, 2006. Available at: https://web.archive.org/web/20110414143801/http://chapters.comsoc.org/comsig/meet.html
 A. Dammann and S. Kaiser. Performance of low complex antenna diversity techniques for mobile OFDM systems. In Proceedings 3rd International Workshop on Multi-Carrier Spread-Spectrum & Related Topics (MC-SS 2001), Oberpfaffenhofen, Germany, pages 53–64, Sept. 2001. .
 P. Larsson, US-6842487 B1, WO/2002/025857, "Cyclic Delay Diversity for Mitigating ISI in OFDM systems", filed 22 September 2000 First filed patent application, PCT Biblio. data from WIPO.

See also

 OFDM
 diversity scheme

Radio resource management